Queen of Ambition is a 2013 South Korean television series, starring Kwon Sang-woo, Soo Ae, Jung Yun-ho, Kim Sung-ryung, and Go Joon-hee. It aired on SBS from 14 January – 2 April 2013 on Mondays and Tuesdays at 21:55 for 24 episodes. Based on Park In-kwon's manhwa of the same title, the same source material as Daemul, the drama tells the tale of an ambitious woman born into poverty who will let nothing stand in her way as she tries to become the First Lady, and a hopeless romantic who will sacrifice anything for her. But when she betrays him, he takes his revenge.

Plot
The name Ha Ryu means "a child flown from heaven." He was given this name by the nun who first found him in front of an orphanage; it came to her immediately the moment she saw his pure, innocent face. Ha Ryu's life began in earnest when he first laid eyes on Da-hae at the orphanage. Ha Ryu was a simple boy who disliked chores; however, for Da-hae, there was nothing he would not do or any place he would not go. Whenever Da-hae cried, Ha Ryu became too restless to do anything. But when Da-hae was adopted, they had to part.

Ten years later, Ha Ryu runs into Da-hae again. He feels electrified and like he is losing his mind. Then and there, he swears that nothing will ever come between them again. He also promises himself that he will do anything and everything to make her happy until the day he dies. Da-hae is a bright young woman and Ha Ryu works day and night with all his strength to earn money to pay her university tuition abroad. No matter how tired he is, all he requires to be happy is Da-hae's smile.

But over time Da-hae changes. Ha Ryu thinks it cannot be permanent when he admires her beauty and sophistication, like a bright, shining star. Even when she frames him for a murder, he tries to understand her. However, when she loses their daughter, Eun-byul, he finally snaps and he cannot forgive her. Ha Ryu changes, too. His wrath erupts like a volcano because of the betrayal of his one true love and turns Ha Ryu into a beast. He, who was once a mere minion in a gang, makes his way to the top and becomes CEO of Baekhak Group, one of South Korea's leading corporations. "I will bring you down with my own two hands and put you back to where you first began. I will step on you and hurt you more than you can imagine," he promises her and his bitter revenge against Da-hae, the woman he, for so long, loved more than life itself, begins... in the end Da-hae becomes the first lady of South Korea, then she is exposed for her crimes after she shoots and injures Ha Ryu.

Ha Ryu then chases after her when Da-hae's step brother escapes with her. He confronts Da-hae for killing his father and when she admits to it he tries to run her over. Ha-Ryu jumps in the away and then he and Da-hae are both hit by the car. Da-hae, still conscious, cries and apologizes to a severely injured Ha Ryu. Then they both pass out and end up in hospital beds. They both imagine having conversations with each other when they were young and finally understand why they grew into the people they became. Ha Ryu wakes up from his coma only to find out Da-hae has died. Ha Ryu continues to live his life and ends the series back at the old house he, Eun-Byul, and Da-hae lived. He looks at the portrait Eun-Byul drew and thinks about all he has lost trying to pursue revenge.

Cast
Kwon Sang-woo - Ha Ryu / Cha Jae-woong 
Chae Sang-woo - young Ha Ryu
Soo Ae - Joo Da-hae
Kim So-yeon - young Da-hae
Park Min-ha - young Da-hae
Jung Yun-ho - Baek Do-hoon 
Kim Sung-ryung - Baek Do-kyung
Go Joon-hee - Seok Soo-jung
Kwon Hyun-sang - Yang Taek-bae
Lee Deok-hwa - Baek Chang-hak
Cha Hwa-yeon - Baek Ji-mi
Lee Jae-yoon - Joo Yang-heon 
Sung Ji-ru - Uhm Sam-do
Lee Il-hwa - Hong Ahn-shim
Go In-beom - Cha Shim-bong
Jung Ho-bin - Seok Tae-il
Yoon Yong-hyun - Director Park
Park Min-ha - Ha Eun-byul (6 years old) 
Kim Ha-yoo - Ha Eun-byul (5 years old) 
Choi Hyun-seo - Eun-joo
Jung Soo-in - Pyo Eun-jung
Kim Sung-hoon - prisoner
Son Tae-young - room salon customer (cameo, ep 2)

Ratings

Awards and nominations

International broadcast
It aired in Japan on cable channel KNTV from 10 May – 18 October 2013, and was re-aired on cable channel WOWOW.

It aired in the Philippines on GMA Network from 15 April – 30 June 2015 at 10:05pm (PST), replacing Empress Ki. It was re-aired on GMA News TV from 15 August – 16 September 2016 at 11:00pm, replacing The Producers.

It aired in Thailand on 3SD beginning on 2 May 2016 at 01:15pm

References

External links
 Yawang official SBS website 
 
 

2013 South Korean television series debuts
2013 South Korean television series endings
Seoul Broadcasting System television dramas
Korean-language television shows
Television shows based on manhwa
South Korean melodrama television series